Intergirl (translit. Interdevochka) is a 1989 Soviet drama film. It is set in Leningrad (Saint Petersburg) in the time of perestroika during the 1980s. The film was the most popular Soviet film in 1989 (41.3 million viewers) and made a star of leading actress Elena Yakovleva.

It is the screen adaptation of the eponymous story by Vladimir Kunin.

Plot
Tanya Zaitseva from Leningrad, a nurse by day and a prostitute catering to foreigners by night, suddenly receives a marriage proposal from a Swedish client. After another altercation with the police, she goes home to share good news with her mother, who thinks that her daughter is just a nurse. Tanya does not hide the fact that she is not marrying for love, but because she wants to have an apartment, a car, money and dreams "to see the world with my own eyes." In a conversation with her mother she argues that prostitution is characteristic of all trades, "all sell themselves.", but her mother cannot accept it.

Tanya's former client and now fiancé, Edvard Larsen, is a pass for Tanya to the Western world of dreams. However, the Soviet bureaucracy gets in the way: there are some requirements to get a visa to Sweden. She needs to receive a permission for immigration from her father, whom she has not seen for 20 years. He demands 3,000 rubles in exchange for the paperwork - a lot of money - which forces Tanya back into prostitution.

Sweden very quickly bores the heroine. She makes friends with a Russian truck driver working for "Sovtransavto", through whom she sends gifts to her mother in Leningrad. Her Swedish "friends" never forget how Tanya earned in the USSR. Ed really loves his wife, but always makes comments about her habits. Tanya is an alien in a foreign world. She is homesick and wants to visit her mother. Meanwhile, Tanya's prostitute friend mentions during a conversation over the phone that they opened case on "illegal foreign currency speculation" on Tanya (for illegal currency transactions was another article, with very strict sanctions). Investigators come to Tanya's mother and reveal the secrets of her daughter's high earnings. Shocked and morally broken by this, Tanya's mother commits suicide by gassing herself to death in her apartment. Skein, a neighbor of Tanya, smells gas at the apartment and bursts in, knocking out the window. She pulls her out from the apartment and tries to revive her, but to no avail. She knocking on the neighbors' doors for help. At this moment in Sweden, Tanya looks back and her intuition tells her that something bad has happened. In panic, she abandoned her lover, jumps into the car and starts driving to the airport and gets killed in car accident. The drama of the final episode is reinforced by the Russian folk song "Tramp" ("In the wild steppes of Transbaikal ..."), which is the leitmotif of the film.

Cast
 Elena Yakovleva as Tanya Zaytseva
 Tomas Laustiola as Edvard Larsen, Tanya Zaytseva's husband (voice by Aleksandr Belyavsky)
 Larisa Malevannaya as Alla Sergeyevna Zaytseva, Tanya's mother
 Anastasiya Nemolyaeva as Lyalya, nurse, Tanya's friend
 Ingeborga Dapkūnaitė as Kisulya, prostitute
 Lyubov Polishchuk as Zina Meleyko, prostitute
 Irina Rozanova as Sima Gulliver, prostitute
 Natalia Shchukina as Natalya «Schoolgirl», prostitute
 Martinsh Vilsons as Victor, trucker
 Vsevolod Shilovsky as Nikolay Platonovich Zaytsev, Tanya's father
 Zinovy Gerdt as Boris Semenovich, chief medical officer
 Valeriy Khromushkin as Volodya,  union organizer of hospital
 Maria Vinogradova as Sergeevna, nurse
 Igor Vetrov as Anatoliy A. Kudryavtsev, police captain
 Gennady Sidorov as Zhenya, police lieutenant
 Tatyana Agafonova as Verka, former Moscow prostitute living in Sweden
 Torsten Wahlund as Gunvald, Edvard Larsen's co-worker
 Sergey Bekhterev as waiter
 Anna Frolovtseva as FRRO employee
 Mintai Utepbergenov as Japanese businessman (voice by Aleksei Zolotnitsky)
 Igor Efimov as hotel janitor

Awards
3 wins and 1 nomination. Elena Yakovleva has won the Best Actress award at Nika, 1990, and Tokyo International Film Festival, 1989.

References

External links

Screenshots
Online version
Swefilmer
Online version  at Movie.ru 

1989 films
Mosfilm films
Films about prostitution in Russia
1980s Russian-language films
1989 in the Soviet Union
Films directed by Pyotr Todorovsky
Prostitution in Russia
Films set in Saint Petersburg
Films set in Sweden
Soviet multilingual films
Swedish multilingual films
Films about nurses